The Spike Jones Show was the name of several separate American comedy and variety series that aired on NBC and CBS in the 1950s and 1960s. The series was presented by actor and musician Spike Jones, his wife, musician Helen Grayco and their band, The City Slickers. The series also featured Billy Barty, Freddy Morgan, Paul Garner, Bill Dana, and Lennie Weinrib.

Show origins

After a short stint on the radio, in the late 1940s, Spike Jones began to see that there might be potential in the fairly new medium of television. With this potential in mind, Jones along with Edward F. Cline filmed two half-hour pilots in the summer of 1950; Foreign Legion and Wild Bill Hiccup. Neither were broadcast. Jones then decided to try live television bringing his wife Helen Grayco and his band, The City Slickers with him. For them, live television proved to be a success. The basis for The Spike Jones Show came about after an episode of The Colgate Comedy Hour on NBC. The episode, entitled "The Spike Jones Show", was originally broadcast on February 11, 1951. Three years after that telecast, NBC offered Jones, Grayco and his band their own slot on television.

Original version (Jan.–May 1954)

The first version of The Spike Jones Show premiered on January 2, 1954 on NBC. The series was the first weekly television series that was presented by Spike Jones. The series also starred Helen Grayco and members of the City Slickers. It ran on Saturday evenings alongside The Jackie Gleason Show on CBS.

Second version (Apr.–Aug. 1957)

Nearly three years after The Spike Jones Show finished its run on NBC, CBS decided to offer Jones and his band their own time slot on Tuesday nights. The CBS reincarnation of The Spike Jones Show premiered on April 2, 1957. However, the series was meant for replacement purposes only and its last episode aired on August 27, 1957.

Final version (Jul.–Sept. 1961)

The final version of The Spike Jones Show premiered on July 31, 1961 on CBS. The series aired on Monday nights as a summer replacement only. Its last episode aired on September 25, 1961. This was the last incarnation of the series.

Episodes

Home media

A DVD entitled The Best of Spike Jones features scenes of the 1954 version of The Spike Jones Show. The DVD was released on November 24, 2009.

References

External links

1954 American television series debuts
1961 American television series endings
1950s American comedy television series
1960s American comedy television series
1950s American variety television series
1960s American variety television series
Black-and-white American television shows
CBS original programming
NBC original programming
Television articles with incorrect naming style